Toras Menachem: Hadranim al HaRambam V'Shas (or Hadranim al HaRambam) is a collection of Rabbi Menachem Mendel Schneerson's commentary on Mishneh Torah and the Talmud. The book contains pilpuls on the ending passages of the Rambam. The book combines Nigla and Chassidus in its approach to the text.

Publishing
The book was first published by Kehot Publication Society in 1992 and was republished in 2000.

See also
 List of commentaries on Mishneh Torah
 Maimonides

References

Chabad-Lubavitch texts
Commentaries on Mishneh Torah
Sifrei Kodesh